The 2017 Cardiff Council election was held on 4 May 2017 as part of the national 2017 Welsh local elections. The elections were preceded by the 2012 elections and were followed by the 2022 elections.

Election result
Labour maintained control of the authority following these elections, gaining their highest popular vote since 1995, but ending up with a reduced number of seats. The Conservatives achieved their best result since the unitary council was created in 1995, winning twenty seats and replacing the Liberal Democrats as the official opposition on the council. Plaid Cymru also secured their highest popular vote, despite standing in fewer seats than in 2012, but only won three seats. The Liberal Democrats in Cardiff suffered their worst election result in terms of total seats won (eleven) since 1995, whilst the local Green Party failed to win its first seat on the council, suffering a fall in support when compared to the 2012 election. The only independent candidate to be elected was Fenella Bowden in the Heath ward, who would become Cardiff Council's longest serving Independent councillor during the council term.

The only member of the original council elected in 1995 who had served continuously since then is Russell Goodway, former leader of the Council, who was again returned for the Ely ward. Others elected in 1995 but who had not remained members continuously included Graham Hinchey, Susan Lent, Sarah Merry, Lynda Thorne (Labour) and Fenella Bowden (LD/Independent).

Leader of the Plaid Cymru group, Neil McEvoy, was the only party leader to remain in post immediately after the election. Leader of the Liberal Democrats, Elizabeth Clark lost her Cathays seat to Labour. Conservative group leader, David Walker, also stood down immediately after the elections. Council leader and leader of the Labour group prior to the election, Phil Bale, was replaced by Splott councillor Huw Thomas.

|}

Manifestos 
The four largest political groups on Cardiff Council produced manifestos for the 2017 local election campaign. The Heath Independents committed to six pledges ahead of the election.

The South Wales Echo also interviewed the four largest political group leaders prior to election day.

Cardiff LabourCardiff ConservativesCardiff Liberal DemocratsPlaid Cymru

Ward results

* = sitting councillor in this ward prior to election

Adamsdown (2 seats)

Butetown (1 seat)

Caerau (2 seats)

Canton (3 seats)

Cathays (4 seats)
Labour won all four seats. Ali Ahmed previously represented Butetown.

Creigiau & St. Fagans (1 seat)

Cyncoed (3 seats)

Ely (3 seats)

Fairwater (3 seats)

Gabalfa (2 seats)

Grangetown (3 seats)
Plaid Cymru lost a seat they had gained in a by-election in November 2016.

Heath (3 seats)
The independent candidates stood again as Heath & Birchgrove Independents.

Lisvane (1 seat)

Llandaff (2 seats)

Llandaff North (2 seats)

Llanishen (4 seats)

Llanrumney (3 seats)

Pentwyn (4 seats)

Pentyrch (1 seat)

Penylan (3 seats)

Plasnewydd (4 seats)
The Liberal Democrats lost a seat they had gained in a by-election.

Pontprennau and Old St. Mellons (2 seats)

Radyr (1 seat)

Rhiwbina (3 seats)
Two of the three Independent councillors elected in 2012 rejoined the Conservatives in 2015 and the third Independent was defeated by a Conservative in this election.

Riverside (3 seats)

Rumney (2 seats)

Splott (3 seats)

Trowbridge (3 seats)
Ralph Cook was elected as a Labour candidate in 2012.

Whitchurch and Tongwynlais (4 seats)

By-elections between 2017 and 2022

Ely

The by-election was caused by the death of Labour councillor Jim Murphy on 1 December 2018.

Cyncoed 

The by-election was caused by the death of Liberal Democrat Councillor Wendy Congreve on 14 May 2019.

Whitchurch & Tongwynlais

The by-election was caused by the death of Conservative councillor Tim Davies on 4 June 2019.

Llanishen

The by-election was caused by the resignation of Labour councillor Phil Bale in Autumn 2019.

Heath

The by-election was cause by the resignation of Councillor Fenella Bowden, who stepped down for health reasons in September 2021.

Other changes between 2017 and 2021 
Neil McEvoy was expelled by Plaid Cymru for 18 months on 19 March 2018, and then sat under the label "Fairwater Cardiff West". In February 2020 he formed the Welsh National Party, later to become "Propel" along with 3 other former Plaid Cymru councillors.  One of those, Ely councillor Andrea Gibson, later left the party and sat as an Independent.

An Electoral Review undertaken by the Local Democracy and Boundary Commission for Wales recommended an increase to the total number of council seats in Cardiff from 75 to 79 ahead of the next election. The changes were accepted with only slight modification, to take effect from the 2022 council election.

References

2017
2017 Welsh local elections
2010s in Cardiff